Guangzhou (160) was a Type 051 destroyer of the People's Liberation Army Navy.

Development and design 
Work resumed in 1965 with nine ships being ordered. Construction started in 1968, with trials beginning in 1971. The ships nominally entered service in the early 1970s, but few were fully operational before 1985; workmanship was poor due to the Cultural Revolution.

Construction of the second batch began in 1977, with the last commissioning in 1991. The second batch may have been ordered due to the Cultural Revolution disrupting development of a successor class. These ships may be designated  Type 051D. The PLAN initiated an abortive modernization program for the first batch in 1982. The ships would be reconstructed with British weapons and sensors acquired from British Aerospace. The Falklands War made the prospective upgrades less impressive and cost effective, and the project was cancelled in 1984. A 1986 upgrade project using American power plants, weapons, sensors, and computers was cancelled because of the 1989 Tiananmen Square protests.

Construction and career 
Guangzhou was launched on 28 April 1971 at the Hudong Shipyard in Shanghai. Commissioned on 30 June 1974 into the South Sea Fleet.

Explosion in 1978 
On 9 March 1978 at 8:40pm, while the ship was docked in Zhanjiang Port, Guangdong Province, it was rocked by a sudden explosion and had sunk by 10:55pm.

After nearly half a year of investigation by a joint team of the General Staff, Navy, and Fleet, the explosion was finally revealed to have been caused by a cadre, Lai Sanyang, who worked in the armory. Lai had been involved with a woman and after he broke off with her, she committed suicide. The Political Department of the detachment decide that Lai should be dismissed as a cadre and demobilized. But Lai begged his superiors not to send him back to his hometown.

After dismissing Lai Sanyang as a cadre, the unit did not immediately demobilize him. Lai was in charge of sea mines, depth charges, underwater weapons and held the key to the armory. Following his dismissal, Lai hid in the ammunition depot and then bored a hole through the hull of the ship, which caused water to rush in and detonate the depth charges.

Aftermath 
Guangzhou went down with 134 sailors and injuring 28. A tomb with the lowest price was selected for re-burying at a place about 10 meters away from the monument to the  ship. In the following days, naval divers continued to retrieve the remains of their comrades in the sea. Afterwards, statistics showed that more than 20 relatively complete remains and 6 large bags of incomplete remains were collected. 11 Type 56 submachine guns, 9 Type 54 pistols and a batch of precision instruments were salvaged.

In 1979, a tugboat located the wreck and towed the ship for scrap. Her stern was cut and converted to a floating dock.

References 

1971 ships
Ships built in China
Type 051 destroyers
Maritime incidents in 1978
Cold War destroyers of the People's Republic of China